Benjamin Franklin Parkway, commonly abbreviated to Ben Franklin Parkway and colloquially called the Parkway, is a boulevard that runs through the cultural heart of Philadelphia. Named for Benjamin Franklin, a Founding Father, the mile-long Parkway cuts diagonally across the grid plan pattern of Center City's northwest quadrant. It starts at Philadelphia City Hall, curves around Logan Circle, and ends before the Philadelphia Museum of Art.

Attractions

The Parkway is the spine of Philadelphia's Museum District. Some of the city's most famous sights are here: Cathedral Basilica of Saints Peter and Paul; Swann Memorial Fountain; Parkway Central Library, the Family Court Building, the Franklin Institute, Moore College of Art and Design, the Academy of Natural Sciences, the Rodin Museum, Eakins Oval, the Barnes Foundation and the Philadelphia Museum of Art. From its northern end, the Parkway provides access to Fairmount Park through Kelly Drive (formerly East River Drive), Martin Luther King Drive (formerly West River Drive), the Schuylkill River Trail, and the Schuylkill Expressway (I-76).

The Parkway also is an outdoor sculpture garden. Works include: The Thinker by Auguste Rodin; Gates of Hell also by Rodin; LOVE by Robert Indiana; The Ideal Scout by Robert Tait McKenzie; Three-Way Piece by Henry Moore; the three River figures in the Swann Memorial Fountain by Alexander Stirling Calder; Shakespeare Memorial also by Calder; The Monument to Six Million Jewish Martyrs by Nathan Rapoport at the Horwitz-Wasserman Holocaust Memorial Plaza; Joseph Leidy by Samuel Murray; Aero Memorial by Paul Manship; General Galusha Pennypacker by Charles Grafly and Albert Laessle; Jesus Breaking Bread by Walter Erlebacher, All Wars Colored Soldiers and Sailors Memorial by J. Otto Schweizer; Thaddeus Kosciuszko by Robert Aitken; Civil War Soldiers and Sailors Memorial by Hermon Atkins MacNeil; Kopernik by Dudley Vaill Talcott; Joan of Arc by Emmanuel Fremiet; Washington Monument by Rudolf Siemering; and the Rocky statue by A. Thomas Schomberg.

Urban renewal

In a city famous for its urban planning, the Parkway represents one of the earliest examples of urban renewal in the United States. The road was constructed to ease heavy industrial congestion in Center City and to restore Philadelphia's natural and artistic beauty, as part of the City Beautiful movement.

The vision for a grand parkway came from retail pioneer John Wanamaker. Preliminary proposals for the Parkway had been produced and added to the City Plan by 1906, but the first comprehensive plan for the Parkway was commissioned in 1907 by the Fairmount Park Art Association (now the Association for Public Art). The Association commissioned architects Horace Trumbauer, Clarence Zantzinger, and Paul Philippe Cret, who created a detailed parkway design that was formally added to the City Plan in 1909. Construction on the Parkway did not begin until 1917, when French landscape architect Jacques Gréber submitted a revised plan to the Commissioners of Fairmount Park.

Gréber designed the Parkway in 1917 to emulate the Champs-Élysées in Paris, France. The route was determined by an axis drawn from City Hall Tower to a fixed point on the hill that William Penn called "Fairmount", now the site of the Philadelphia Museum of Art. The Champs-Élysées terminates at the Arc de Triomphe, and the Parkway's terminating at the Art Museum gives the notion of "a slice of Paris in Philadelphia." The Parkway contains flags of countries from around the world.

The traffic rotary on the western end of the Parkway, at the foot of the Art Museum's Rocky Steps, is named Eakins Oval after Philadelphia painter Thomas Eakins. The traffic lanes around Eakins Oval originally formed a regular oval; this pattern was modified in the early 1960s to its present elongated circular shape, with the truncated lanes serving as staging areas for various events.

Because of its central location, the Parkway is the site for many concerts and parades. On July 2, 2005, the steps of the museum played host to the Philadelphia venue of Live 8, where artists such as Dave Matthews Band, Linkin Park and Maroon 5 performed. The Parkway was also the site of Jay-Z's Made in America Festival on September 1–2, 2012 featuring Jay-Z, Pearl Jam, Skrillex and Calvin Harris, among others; the Parkway has been used for several subsequent editions of the Made in America Festival.  On September 26 and 27, 2015, Pope Francis visited Philadelphia for that year's World Meeting of Families; the Parkway was flooded with over a million visitors both weekend days, a Celebration of Families on Saturday, and a Holy Mass on Sunday.

In recent years, there has been concern that the original plan of a wide, multi-sectioned, multi-laned, tree-lined boulevard, while beautiful to travel on, is not very engaging for pedestrian or other public use. Traffic along the Parkway has decreased considerably because of the completion of Interstate 676 (Vine Street Expressway), linking the Schuylkill Expressway with the Benjamin Franklin Bridge. In response, the roadway has been narrowed somewhat and the sidewalks expanded around Logan Circle. Various plans for the rest of the Parkway, some of which would insert shops and other smaller structures into the long stretches between museums, have been proposed, but none so far have been thought feasible or financially sound.

A new museum for the Barnes Foundation collection of Impressionist art on the site between the Free Library and the Rodin Museum opened in Spring 2012.

Gallery

See also

Rocky Steps
Academy of Natural Sciences
Jacques Gréber

References

Further reading
 Kyriakodis, Harry (2014). The Benjamin Franklin Parkway, Arcadia Publishing (postcard history book).

External links
Parkway Museums District
Ben Franklin Parkway rehabilitation project (National Park Service) 
The Philadelphia Museum of Art
 Center City Parks District - supports parks along the Parkway

Streets in Philadelphia
Parkways in the United States
Transport infrastructure completed in 1917
Municipal parks in Philadelphia
Arts districts
Center City, Philadelphia
1917 establishments in Pennsylvania